Emscher-Lippe-Halle is an indoor sporting arena located in Gelsenkirchen, Germany. It is used for various indoor events and is the home arena of the ice hockey team EHC Gelsenkirchen.  It also hosted the annual Bofrost Cup on Ice figure skating event. The capacity of the arena is 2,600 spectators.

External links
Venue information

Indoor arenas in Germany
Indoor ice hockey venues in Germany
Sport in Gelsenkirchen
Sports venues in North Rhine-Westphalia
Buildings and structures in Gelsenkirchen